{{DISPLAYTITLE:C5H11NO2}}
The molecular formula C5H11NO2 may refer to:

 β-Alanine ethyl ester
 Amyl nitrite
 Isovaline
 N-Methylmorpholine N-oxide
 Norvaline
 Pentyl nitrite
 Trimethylglycine
 Valine